Siletz (Tolowa: sii-let-ts’i ) is a city in Lincoln County, Oregon, United States. The population was 1,212 at the 2010 census. The city is located next to the Siletz Reservation and is the site of the annual Nesika Illahee Pow Wow in August.

Geography

Demographics

2010 census
As of the census of 2010, there were 1,212 people, 448 households, and 321 families living in the city. The racial makeup of the city was 69.7% White, 0.4% African American, 18.4% Native American, 0.4% Asian, 0.2% Pacific Islander, 1.5% from other races, and 9.4% from two or more races. Hispanic or Latino of any race were 5.0% of the population.

There were 448 households, of which 33.9% had children under the age of 18 living with them, 50.7% were married couples living together, 14.7% had a female householder with no husband present, 6.3% had a male householder with no wife present, and 28.3% were non-families. 21.0% of all households were made up of individuals, and 7.6% had someone living alone who was 65 years of age or older. The average household size was 2.67 and the average family size was 3.07.

The median age in the city was 42 years. 24.5% of residents were under the age of 18; 7.1% were between the ages of 18 and 24; 21.4% were from 25 to 44; 32.9% were from 45 to 64; and 14.3% were 65 years of age or older. The gender makeup of the city was 50.5% male and 49.5% female.

2000 census
As of the census of 2000, there were 1,133 people, 420 households, and 315 families living in the city. The population density was 1,799.3 people per square mile (694.4/km). There were 468 housing units at an average density of 743.2 per square mile (286.8/km). The racial makeup of the city was 71.23% White, 0.44% African American, 21.01% Native American, 0.71% Asian, 0.09% Pacific Islander, 0.44% from other races, and 6.09% from two or more races. Hispanic or Latino of any race were 1.85% of the population.

There were 420 households, out of which 36.9% had children under the age of 18 living with them, 57.1% were married couples living together, 12.1% had a female householder with no husband present, and 25.0% were non-families. 19.8% of all households were made up of individuals, and 9.5% had someone living alone who was 65 years of age or older. The average household size was 2.70 and the average family size was 3.04.

In the city, the population was spread out, with 28.9% under the age of 18, 7.5% from 18 to 24, 28.9% from 25 to 44, 22.6% from 45 to 64, and 12.1% who were 65 years of age or older. The median age was 36 years. For every 100 females, there were 104.5 males. For every 100 females age 18 and over, there were 99.8 males.

The median income for a household in the city was $38,542, and the median income for a family was $42,250. Males had a median income of $32,153 versus $21,250 for females. The per capita income for the city was $14,690. About 11.0% of families and 15.4% of the population were below the poverty line, including 20.6% of those under age 18 and 8.1% of those age 65 or over.

References

External links

 Entry for Siletz in the Oregon Blue Book

Cities in Oregon
Cities in Lincoln County, Oregon
1946 establishments in Oregon
Oregon placenames of Native American origin